Henry Rotton (1814 – 11 October 1881) was an English-born Australian politician.

Rotton was born at Frome Selwood in Somerset to solicitor Gilbert Rotton and Mary Caroline Humphries. After failing to enter the Royal Navy, he entered the merchant navy as a midshipman and later officer. In 1836 he arrived at Kangaroo Island, whence he journeyed to Sydney. In 1839 he married Lorn Jane Macpherson, with whom he had two children; a second marriage on 18 March 1844 to Ann Ford produced a further eleven children. He ran an inn near Rydal in 1839 and ran mail coaches between Bathurst and Orange from 1849. From 1853 he was a horse and cattle breeder near Kelso. In 1858 he was elected to the New South Wales Legislative Assembly for Western Boroughs. He transferred to Hartley in 1859, representing that seat until his defeat in 1864. Rotton died at Mynora near Moruya in 1881.

References

 

1814 births
1881 deaths
Members of the New South Wales Legislative Assembly
19th-century Australian politicians